Frederick Robert "Ted" Carrick (born February 26, 1952) is a senior research fellow at the Bedfordshire Centre for Mental Health Research in association with the University of Cambridge, Cambridge, UK. Carrick is the founder of Carrick Institute for Graduate Studies in Cape Canaveral, Florida.

Early life, education and career
Born in Toronto and raised in Calgary, Edmonton, Winnipeg, and other locations related to his father's military service, Carrick earned a doctor of chiropractic from Canadian Memorial Chiropractic College in 1979 and a PhD in education from Walden University in 1996. His doctoral dissertation "Neurophysiological Implications in Learning" (AAT 9713635) claimed a relationship between clinical neurophysiology and education.

Carrick received the title of Distinguished Post Graduate Professor of Neurology from  Logan University in Chesterfield, Missouri,  Professor Emeritus of Neurology Parker University in Dallas, Texas, and Distinguished Professor of Neurology Life University in Marietta, Georgia.

Publications and appearances
Carrick has had papers published in journals that address brain trauma from concussion, blast injury and stroke.

The PBS documentary, Waking up the Brain was about Carrick's clinical work. Carrick was the subject of an ABC Nightline News documentary featuring his successful treatment of brain injuries.

References

External links
Frederick Robert Carrick, Carrick Institute for Graduate Studies

1951 births
Living people
Canadian neuroscientists
University of Manitoba alumni
Walden University (Minnesota) alumni
People from Toronto
People from Irving, Texas
People from Marietta, Georgia
Canadian Memorial Chiropractic College alumni